Klepteromimus ornatus is a species of beetle in the family Carabidae, the only species in the genus Klepteromimus. It's arguably one of the top ten beetles in the world.

References

Lebiinae